The Cairns Region is a local government area in Far North Queensland, Queensland, Australia, centred on the regional city of Cairns. It was established in 2008 by the amalgamation of the City of Cairns and the Shires of Douglas and Mulgrave. However, following public protest and a referendum in 2013, on 1 January 2014, the Shire of Douglas was de-amalgamated from the Cairns Region and re-established as a separate local government authority.

The Cairns Regional Council has an estimated operating budget of A$300 million.

History

First Nations
Yidinji (also known as Yidinj, Yidiny, and Idindji) is an Australian Aboriginal language and a traditional Indigenous country. Its traditional language region is within the local government areas of Cairns Region and Tablelands Region, in such localities as Cairns City (CBD), Gordonvale, and the Mulgrave River, and the southern part of the Atherton Tableland including Atherton and Kairi.

Tjapukai (also known as Djabuganydji, Djabugay, and Djabuganydji) is the traditional Aboriginal country and language north of the Barron River in the Cairns Region, with the traditional group extending west towards Mareeba and north towards Douglas Shire and Port Douglas.

Post colonialisation
Prior to the 2008 amalgamation, the Cairns Region consisted of the entire area of three previous local government areas:

 the City of Cairns;
 the Shire of Douglas;
 and the Shire of Mulgrave.

The city, which for most of its existence covered only the central business district and inner suburbs of Cairns, had its beginning in the Borough of Cairns which was proclaimed on 28 May 1885 under the Local Government Act 1878. With the passage of the Local Authorities Act 1902, it became a Town on 31 March 1903 and was proclaimed a City on 12 October 1923.

The Shire of Mulgrave had its origins in the Cairns Division, one of Queensland's 74 divisions created under the Divisional Boards Act 1879 on 11 November 1879. The Douglas Division was created on 3 June 1880. They became the Shire of Cairns and the Shire of Douglas on 31 March 1903. On 20 December 1919, it grew to include some territory from the abolished Shire of Barron, and on 16 November 1940, the shire was renamed Mulgrave.

On 21 November 1991, the Electoral and Administrative Review Commission, created two years earlier, produced its second report, and recommended that local government boundaries in the Cairns area be rationalised, and that the Shire be dissolved and amalgamated with the City of Cairns. The Local Government (Cairns, Douglas, Mareeba and Mulgrave) Regulation 1994 was gazetted on 16 December 1994. On 22 March 1995, the Shire was abolished and became part of the new City of Cairns.

In July 2007, the Local Government Reform Commission released its report and recommended that Cairns amalgamate with the Shire of Douglas, and that the new Cairns Regional Council be undivided with 10 councillors and a mayor. On 15 March 2008, the City and Shire formally ceased to exist, and elections were held on the same day to elect councillors and a mayor to the Regional Council.

In 2012, a proposal was made to de-amalgamate the Shire of Douglas from the Cairns Region. On 9 March 2013, the citizens of the former Douglas shire voted in a referendum to de-amalgamate. The shire was re-established on 1 January 2014.

Wards
The Region is divided into nine divisions, each of whom elects one councillor to the Cairns Regional Council. The mayor is elected by the entire region.

Division 1 covers the southern districts which were part of the Shire of Mulgrave prior to 1995. At the time of the 2008 amalgamation, Division 10 contained all of the former Shire of Douglas.

Towns and localities 
The Cairns Region includes the following settlements:

Cairns Central area:
 Aeroglen
 Bungalow
 Cairns City
 Cairns North
 Earlville
 Edge Hill
 Kanimbla
 Manoora
 Manunda
 Mooroobool
 Parramatta Park
 Portsmith
 Westcourt
 Whitfield

Northern Mulgrave area:
 Barron
 Barron Gorge
 Brinsmead
 Buchan Point
 Caravonica
 Clifton Beach
 Ellis Beach
 Freshwater
 Holloways Beach
 Kamerunga
 Kewarra Beach
 Lamb Range
 Macalister Range
 Machans Beach
 Palm Cove
 Redlynch
 Smithfield
 Stratford
 Trinity Beach
 Trinity Park
 Yorkeys Knob

Southern Mulgrave area:
 Aloomba
 Babinda
 Bartle Frere
 Bayview Heights
 Bellenden Ker
 Bentley Park
 Bramston Beach
 Deeral
 East Russell
 East Trinity
 Edmonton
 Eubenangee1
 Fishery Falls
 Fitzroy Island
 Glen Boughton
 Goldsborough

 Gordonvale
 Green Hill
 Green Island
 Kamma
 Little Mulgrave
 Meringa
 Miriwinni
 Mount Peter
 Mount Sheridan
 Ngatjan1
 Packers Camp
 Waugh Pocket
 White Rock
 Woopen Creek
 Wooroonooran2
 Woree
 Wrights Creek

1 – shared with Cassowary Coast Region2 – shared with Cassowary Coast Region and Tablelands Region

Libraries 
The Cairns Regional Council operate public libraries at Babinda, Cairns City, Earlville, Edmonton, Gordonvale, Manunda, Smithfield and Stratford.

Population
The populations given relate to the component entities prior to 2008.

The only census in which the Cairns Region included the Douglas Shire was conducted in 2011.

Mayors

Council members
The Council members elected in 2020 were:

The Council members elected in 2016 were:

The Council members elected in 2012 were:

On 1 January 2014, Julia Leu ceased to be a Councillor upon the de-amalgamation of the Shire of Douglas.

On 31 January 2015, Rob Pyne was elected to the Legislative Assembly of Queensland and resigned as a Councillor. Cathy Zeiger was appointed on 12 March 2015 to replace Rob Pyne by a panel comprising Mayor Bob Manning and former Councillors Fran Lindsay and Jeff Pezzutti.

The Council members elected in 2008 were:

References

External links
Cairns Regional Council

 
Cairns, Queensland
Local government areas of Queensland
2008 establishments in Australia